N1 is a 24-hour cable news channel launched on 30 October 2014. The channel has headquarters in Ljubljana, Belgrade, Sarajevo and Zagreb and covers events happening in Central and Southeastern Europe. Available on cable TV throughout former Yugoslavia, N1 is CNN International's local broadcast partner and affiliate via an agreement with the London-based Warner Bros. Discovery EMEA. As it is focused on the audiences of the three countries in which it is headquartered, it has three separate editorial policies, separate reporters, TV studios as well as internet and mobile platforms. In cases where news overlaps, it is presented jointly.

Serbia

The Organization for Security and Co-operation in Europe (OSCE) and Pauline Adès-Mével, a representative of Reporters Without Borders, described N1 as “the only big independent television station in Serbia”. Workers have been constantly labeled as “traitors” and “foreign mercenaries” and received hundreds of insults and threats of physical violence through social media. Unidentified individuals sent a letter to the station on 4 February 2019 threatening to kill its journalists and their families and blow up its offices.

After Vučić was hospitalized with cardiovascular problems in November 2019, his associates and pro-regime media accused the N1 journalist Miodrag Sovilj of aggravating the President's health by probing allegations of corruption by government ministers. The Council of Europe's platform on journalist safety warns about a lack of state response to intimidation, threats and a smear campaign against Sovilj. The representative of Reporters Without Borders expressed concern about attacks faced by the Station’s executive director, as well as about the distribution of leaflets advising N1 to leave Serbia and threats made via social networks.

In January 2020, the European Federation of Journalists associated itself with the Independent Association of Serbia’s Journalists in supporting N1. It stated that it viewed the state-owned cable operator’s decision to drop N1 as an attempt to shut down critical discourse in Serbia. Parallel to the dispute between the United Group and cable operator, Harlem Désir, the OSCE Representative on Freedom of the Media and Reporters Without Borders both expressed concern over cyberattacks on N1’s Serbian web portal and mobile app.

References

External links

24-hour television news channels
Bosnian-language mass media
Croatian-language television stations
Serbian-language television shows
Television channels and stations established in 2014
Television channels in North Macedonia
Television stations in Bosnia and Herzegovina
Television channels in Croatia
Television stations in Serbia
Bosnia and Herzegovina news websites
Croatian news websites
Serbian news websites